An algorithmic paradigm or algorithm design paradigm is a generic model or framework which underlies the design of a class of algorithms. An algorithmic paradigm is an abstraction higher than the notion of an algorithm, just as an algorithm is an abstraction higher than a computer program.

List of well-known paradigms

General 

Backtracking
Branch and bound
Brute-force search
Divide and conquer
Dynamic programming
Greedy algorithm
Recursion
Prune and search

Parameterized complexity 

 Kernelization
 Iterative compression

Computational geometry 

 Sweep line algorithms
 Rotating calipers
 Randomized incremental construction

References 

Algorithms